The Prix Langlois was a prize awarded by the Académie française from 1868 to 1987 for "the best translation in verse or prose of a Greek, Latin or foreign-language work".

Laureates

See also
Former prizes awarded by the Académie française

References

Académie Française awards